Hasensee is a lake in the canton of Thurgau, Switzerland. It is located in the same valley as  Nussbaumersee and Hüttwilersee.

Hasensee is or was also known as Buchemer See or oberer See (upper lake).

External links 
 Stiftung Seebachtal 

Lakes of Switzerland
Lakes of Thurgau
LHasensee